Transformers: The Album  is a compilation album of various artists music from the 2007 live-action film Transformers. The official single from the album is "Before It's Too Late (Sam and Mikaela's Theme)" by the Goo Goo Dolls.

The first single "What I've Done" by Linkin Park was 5× Platinum rated by RIAA in the United States and rated as gold in Germany and Japan. The soundtrack debuted at number 21 on the U.S Billboard 200, selling about 32,000 copies in its first week. The album has sold 150,000 copies. Each group on the album, except for Julien-K, was signed to a label owned by Warner Music Group at the time of the album's release. Tracks 7, 9, 10, and 12 do not appear in the actual film.

Track listing

Not included in the Soundtrack

Chart performance

See also

Transformers: The Score

References

External links
 Official website
 Information released on IGN

Transformers (film series) soundtracks
Julien-K
Linkin Park albums
2007 soundtrack albums
2000s film soundtrack albums
Warner Records soundtracks